Hoodi Halt railway station (station code: HDIH) is an Indian Railways station located in  Hoodi, Bangalore, in the Indian state of Karnataka.

Demand
There was a sustained demand for stop at Hoodi from 2013 by commuters in the Whitefield area, who campaigned through public forums and social media.

A footbridge was constructed in April 2019.

Structure and expansion 

Timetable: towards Bangarpet

Timetable: towards K S R Bengaluru

Line
The railway station is located between Krishnarajapuram railway station and Whitefield railway station.

See also 

 List of railway stations in India

References

External links

Arrivals at HDIH/Hoodi Halt

Railway stations in Bangalore
Bangalore railway division